Avensa Flight 007 was operated by a McDonnell Douglas DC-9-32 which crashed on 11 March 1983 on a domestic flight from Caracas Airport to Barquisimeto Airport, Venezuela. It landed hard, skidded off of the runway and exploded. Twenty-two passengers and one crew member died.

Accident
The Douglas DC-9, registration YV-67C, was on an internal flight when it made an ILS approach in thick fog at Barquisimeto Airport, Venezuela. The DC-9 landed hard 1,015 meters beyond the runway threshold, causing the landing gear to collapse. The aircraft subsequently slid off the runway and exploded. The aircraft was carrying 45 passengers and 5 crew, of whom one crewman and 22 of the passengers died. Ten passengers were seriously injured. Amongst the dead was Luis Enrique Arias, sports narrator of the Venezuelan Television Network.

Investigation
The probable causes were ruled to be "Improper in-flight decisions and inadequate supervision of the flight".

References 

Aviation accidents and incidents in 1983
Aviation accidents and incidents in Venezuela
Accidents and incidents involving the McDonnell Douglas DC-9
Airliner accidents and incidents caused by pilot error
Airliner accidents and incidents involving fog
Avensa accidents and incidents
March 1983 events in South America
1983 disasters in Venezuela